Gennadiy Dmitriyevich Kondrashov (born 8 December 1938 in Zugres, Sverdlovsk Oblast) is a retired male hammer thrower, who competed  for the Soviet Union at the 1968 Summer Olympics. He set his personal best (70.52 metres) on 21 July 1968 in Leningrad.

International competitions

References
trackfield.brinkster

1938 births
Living people
Sportspeople from Sverdlovsk Oblast
Soviet male hammer throwers
Russian male hammer throwers
Olympic male hammer throwers
Olympic athletes of the Soviet Union
Athletes (track and field) at the 1968 Summer Olympics
Universiade medalists in athletics (track and field)
Universiade gold medalists for the Soviet Union
Medalists at the 1961 Summer Universiade
Medalists at the 1963 Summer Universiade
Medalists at the 1965 Summer Universiade
Japan Championships in Athletics winners